Mara Lake is a lake in the Shuswap Country of the Southern Interior of British Columbia, Canada, located immediately south of the community of Sicamous and to the north of the community of Enderby.  It is the outlet of the Shuswap River, which begins in the Monashee Mountains to the east.  Its own outlet is Sicamous Narrows, which is a short canal-like stretch of water connecting to Shuswap Lake and passing beneath the Trans-Canada Highway and the Canadian Pacific Railway mainline at Sicamous.  All are part of the drainage of the South Thompson River, which begins at the outlet of Little Shuswap Lake.

The lake is navigable from Shuswap Lahich is a popular boating area, and in addition to Mara Provincial Park its shores include the Mara Point Site of Shuswap Lake Marine Provincial Park.

Name origin

"After John Andrew Mara, an Overlander of '62; born at Toronto; had store at Seymour on Shuswap Lake in 1865, later at Kamloops; merchant, miller, steamship operator, promoter of Kootenay Steam Navigation Company and Shuswap & Okanagan Railway (CPR, Sicamous-Okanagan Lake), MLA, 1871 - 86 (Speaker, 1883 - 86); MP, 1887 - 96. Retired to Victoria, where he died February 11, 1920, aged 79."

History
An Internment camp was set up at Tents and Bunkhouses in Mara Lake from June 1915 to July 1917.

Nearby community

The Sicamous region also sees many tourists every summer. Approximately 90% of the population of the nearby community of Swansea Point is seasonal, with thousands of visitors each summer during the months of July and August.

References

Lakes of British Columbia
Shuswap Country
Lakes of the Okanagan
Kamloops Division Yale Land District